Anosibe An'ala is a city in Anosibe An'ala District, Alaotra-Mangoro Region, Madagascar. It is situated at 186 km from Antananarivo and 72 km from Moramanga to which it is linked by the unpaved road RIP23 that is only suitable for 4x4 driven cars.

The Sandrangato river flows near this town where it also forms the Niagarakely falls.
The town is also close to the rivers Menakoranga and Menambolosa. Also the Manampotsy has its springs in the commune.

Education
The town disposes of 58 elementary schools, 4 secondary schools and 1 Lycée.
The scolarisation rate is 74%.

Religion
FJKM - Fiangonan'i Jesoa Kristy eto Madagasikara (Church of Jesus Christ in Madagascar)
EEM - Eklesia Episkopaly Malagasy (Anglican Church of Madagascar)
Roman Catholic Church

Agriculture
Main crops are rice, manioc, coffee (1895 ha), sugar cane (895 ha), Cloves (50 ha), peanuts (25 ha) and honey.

References

Populated places in Alaotra-Mangoro